Roland Loomis (August 10, 1930 – August 1, 2018), known professionally as Fakir Musafar, was an American performance artist considered to be one of the founders of the modern primitive movement.

Life 

Born Roland Loomis, at age 4, he claimed to have experienced dreams of past lives which, along with his anthropological studies, influenced his interests in body modification. He served in the army during the Korean War, and was first married for a short time in the 1960s. In 1966 or 1967, he first performed a flesh hook suspension, inspired by his viewing of anthropological works. In 1977, he gave himself the name Fakir Musafar.

In the 1985 documentary Dances Sacred and Profane, he was shown walking while wearing a device that pressed many small skewers into his upper body, and hanging from a tree by hooks in his chest, in his modified versions of other cultures' sacred ceremonies. He was an extra ('Man in hotel room') in Die Jungfrauen Maschine (The Virgin Machine) in 1988, and in 1991, he appeared in My Father Is Coming as Fakir. He was featured in the 1989 book Modern Primitives, which documented, propagated, and became influential in the modern body modification subcultures.

In 1990, he married Cléo Dubois. From 1992 until 1999, he published the magazine Body Play and Modern Primitives Quarterly, which focused on body modification topics such as human branding, suspension, contortionism, binding, and modern piercing culture. He led "Fakir Intensives" training workshops on these topics in San Francisco.

Illness and death 
In May 2018, Loomis announced on his website that he was suffering from terminal lung cancer. He died on the morning of 1 August 2018. His death was initially announced in a public Facebook post by his wife Cléo Dubois, and later confirmed by an obituary in Artforum.

Tributes
The Leather Archives and Museum, founded in 1991, has a Fakir Musafar exhibit as a permanent exhibit. In 1993, he received the Steve Maidhof Award for National or International Work from the National Leather Association International. In 2019, he was inducted into the Leather Hall of Fame, and he is also an inductee of the Society of Janus Hall of Fame. The Berkeley University Bancroft Library and the Association of Professional Piercers also have large archives of his work in photography, published writings, workshops, and BodyPlay magazines. His memorial bench in Byxbee Park in Palo Alto reads "Body is the door to Spirit".

Bibliography
 Fakir Musafar: Spirit + Flesh, Arena Editions, 2004,

See also 
 Domination & submission (BDSM)
 Risk-aware consensual kink
 Sadomasochism
 Safe, sane and consensual
 Sexual fetishism

Notes

References
 Biography
 Body Modification E-zine interview
 National Geographic documentary Taboo

External links 
 Excerpt of interview - Discusses modern primitives, from RE/Search

1930 births
2018 deaths
United States Army personnel of the Korean War
American erotic photographers
American people of Swedish descent
BDSM photographers
Body piercers
Culture of San Francisco
Deaths from lung cancer in California
Modern primitive
People from Aberdeen, South Dakota